New End Hospital was a hospital in Hampstead, north London. It was founded in 1869 as the infirmary for the Hampstead Union workhouse, and operated until 1986. The buildings have now been redeveloped as housing.

History

New End Hospital was founded as the infirmary for the Hampstead workhouse in 1869. It was taken over by London County Council in 1930, at which time it had 260 beds. Sir Thomas Peel Dunhill established a Thyroid Clinic in 1931 for the treatment of patients with toxic goitre and myasthenia gravis.

Until the outbreak of First World War, New End Hospital's patients included the unemployed, homeless, and unmarried mothers, and their children. It also had an infirmary for the treatment of psychiatric patients. During the First World War New End Hospital was primarily used for the treatment of wounded and shell-shocked soldiers.

The hospital was taken over by the London County Council in 1930, and became well known as a centre for endocrinology. It joined the National Health Service in 1948 under the management of the North East Metropolitan Regional Hospital Board. It remained in use until 1986, when it was sold and the proceeds used to fund the redevelopment of Queen Mary's Maternity Home.

The former hospital mortuary served as the New End Theatre before being converted into a Jewish cultural centre in 2011.

See also
 Healthcare in London
 List of hospitals in England

References

1986 disestablishments in England
Residential buildings completed in 1869
Defunct hospitals in London
Health in the London Borough of Camden
Hospitals established in 1869
Buildings and structures in Hampstead
Poor law infirmaries